Grzegorz Piesio (born July 17, 1988 in Garwolin) is a Polish footballer who plays as a midfielder for Wilga Garwolin.

Career
In the beginning of August 2019, Piesio joined Kotwica Kołobrzeg.

Honours

Club
Arka Gdynia
 Polish Super Cup: 2017

References

External links
 
 

Living people
1988 births
Polish footballers
Ekstraklasa players
I liga players
Górnik Łęczna players
Arka Gdynia players
Ząbkovia Ząbki players
Amica Wronki players
OKS Stomil Olsztyn players
Znicz Pruszków players
GKS Katowice players
Kotwica Kołobrzeg footballers
People from Garwolin County
Sportspeople from Masovian Voivodeship
Association football midfielders